Bill Turner (11 November 1912 – 22 September 1981) was an Australian rules footballer who played with Essendon in the Victorian Football League (VFL).

Notes

External links 
		

1912 births
1981 deaths
Australian rules footballers from Tasmania
Essendon Football Club players